Let Me Fly is the eighth studio album by Mike + The Mechanics, released in 2017 by BMG.

Track listing

Personnel 
Mike and The Mechanics
 Mike Rutherford – electric guitars, bass guitar, drum programming, backing vocals 
 Tim Howar – lead vocals (2, 4, 7, 10), backing vocals 
 Andrew Roachford – lead vocals (1, 3, 5, 6, 8, 9, 11, 12), backing vocals, keyboards
 Luke Juby – keyboards
 Anthony Drennan – electric guitars
 Gary Wallis – drums

Additional personnel
 Clark Datchler – acoustic piano (5, 6, 9)
 Zak Kemp – drum programming  (5, 6)
 Patrick Mascall – programming (8, 11)
 Xavier Barnett, Godfrey Gayle, Priscilla Jones-Campbell, Cherrice Kirton, Joy Malcolm and Subrina McCalla – choir (1)

Production 
 Harry Rutherford – engineer, mixing
 Dick Beetham – mastering
 Neal Panchal – art direction, design
 Mike Rutherford – art concept
 Joe Waghorn – artwork 
 Martin Griffin – digital imaging 
 Patrick "Paddy" Balls – photography 
 Tony Smith – manager 
 Stephen Roachford – manager

Studios
 Recorded at The Farm (Chiddingfold, Surrey, UK); Metrophonic Studios (London, UK); Mike's Home Studio.
 Mastered at 360 Mastering (Hastings, East Sussex, UK).

References 

Mike + The Mechanics albums
2017 albums
BMG Rights Management albums
Albums produced by Mike Rutherford
Albums produced by Brian Rawling
Albums produced by Mark Taylor (music producer)